On a vehicle, a gaiter or boot refers to a protective flexible sleeve covering a moving part, intended to keep the part clean.

On motorcycles and bicycles

Gaiters are pleated rubber tubes enclosing the front suspension tubes of some motorcycles and mountain bikes with telescopic front forks. Gaiters protect the sliding parts of the front suspension from dirt and water.

On cars and other vehicles
Similar gaiters to those described above find multiple uses on most vehicles. They are used at both ends of driveshafts, protecting constant-velocity joints from the ingress of dirt, and retaining the grease. They also prevent the ingress of dirt where one component slides within another, for example, on suspension struts or the ends of steering racks. Finally, they are also usually used to perform the same function on ball joints, which appear on suspension wishbones and steering tie rod ends.  
The gear stick gaiter is to resist dirt entering the ball joint at the bottom of the stick and to not have oil or grease from the joint exposed to passengers.  They are commonly leather, faux leather, rubber or a waterproof cloth.

Vehicle technology